Rhinotyphlops unitaeniatus, commonly known as the yellow-striped blind snake or the Kenya beaked snake, is a species of snake in the Typhlopidae family. It is endemic to Africa.

Geographic range
It is found in eastern Kenya, Somalia, and northeastern Tanzania.

Description
Dorsum black, with a yellow vertebral stripe, which is three scale rows wide. Venter black. The lips, the ventral surface of the snout, and a stripe on the rostral are all brownish yellow.

Total length .

Scales arranged in 25 rows around the body at midbody, in 27 rows anteriorly.

Snout very prominent, hooked, with a sharp horizontal edge, below which are located the nostrils. Rostral very large, extending posteriorly far beyond the eyes. Nasal extending over the eye, in contact with the small ocular. One preocular and one subocular. Eyes distinguishable. Four upper labials. Diameter of body 62 or 63 times in total length. Tail very short.

Habitat

References

Further reading
 Peters, W. 1878. Über die von Hrn. J.M. Hildebrandt während seiner letzen ostafrikanischen Reise gesammelten Säugethiere und Amphibien. Monatsberichte der Königlich preussischen Akademie der Wissenschaften zu Berlin, Volume 1878, pp. 194–209. [Typhlops (Letheobia) unitaeniatus, p. 205, plate ii, figure 5.]

Typhlopidae
Reptiles described in 1878
Taxa named by Wilhelm Peters